Carina de Rooij-Versloot (born 10 May 1980) is a Dutch wheelchair basketball player. She is a member of the Netherlands women's national wheelchair basketball team. She competed at four Paralympic Games and won two Paralympic bronze medal, and a gold medal.

Biigraphy
Versloot broke her back in 1999 during gymnastics training at the Hellas gymnastics club in Tiel. As a result, she had incomplete paraplegia. During her rehabilitation at the Rehabilitation Center "De Hoogsstraat" in Utrecht, she came into contact with wheelchair basketball.

After competing at the 2004 Summer Paralympics and 2008 Summer Paralympics she won the bronze medal at the 2012 Paralympics and also four years later at the 2016 Summer Paralympics. She also competed at other international tournaments, including the 2014 Women's World Wheelchair Basketball Championship and 2018 Wheelchair Basketball World Championship.

She is a member of the International Wheelchair Basketball Federation's Athlete Steering Committee. In daily life she is a child and youth psychologist.

References

External links 
Gold medalist Ilse Arts and Carina de Rooij of Team Netherlands News Photo - Getty Images

1980 births
Living people
Paralympic bronze medalists for the Netherlands
Dutch women's wheelchair basketball players
Paralympic wheelchair basketball players of the Netherlands
Paralympic medalists in wheelchair basketball
Medalists at the 2016 Summer Paralympics
Medalists at the 2012 Summer Paralympics
Wheelchair basketball players at the 2016 Summer Paralympics
Wheelchair basketball players at the 2012 Summer Paralympics
Wheelchair basketball players at the 2008 Summer Paralympics
Wheelchair basketball players at the 2004 Summer Paralympics
20th-century Dutch women
21st-century Dutch women